Kenneth W. Winters (born June 24, 1934) is Kentucky politician who served in the Kentucky State Senate and as president of Campbellsville University.

He graduated from Murray State University in 1957 with a Bachelor of Science degree in industrial arts. He was a member of Epsilon Pi Tau honor society and Scabbard and Blade.

References

1934 births
Republican Party Kentucky state senators
Heads of universities and colleges in the United States
Murray State University alumni
Indiana University alumni
University of Northern Colorado alumni
United States Army soldiers
People from Murray, Kentucky
People from Campbellsville, Kentucky
Baptists from Kentucky
People from Crittenden County, Kentucky
Living people